Cryptek is a company that develops and sells information security products and services to governments and corporations. Cryptek is headquartered in Dulles, Virginia, United States.

History 

Cryptek was founded in 1986 as Cryptek Secure Communications, Inc.  At that time, the company designed and manufactured field-deployable, secure FAX machines for the military of the United States.  In 1988, Cryptek was acquired by General Kinetics, a manufacturer of secure enclosures and other products.  In 1993, General Kinetics also acquired Verdix, a manufacturer of secure computer networking equipment for the government of the United States.

In 1996, private equity firm Angelo, Gordon & Co. acquired the FAX and secure networking businesses of General Kinetics.  The company continued to operate as Cryptek Secure Communications, LLC.  The company simplified its name to Cryptek, Inc. in 2002.

In 2005, Cryptek went through a corporate restructuring in which Bill Anderson became the President and CEO.  In 2007, Cryptek acquired three companies: Secure Systems Group of Sterling, Virginia, United States, Emcon Emanation Control Ltd of Ottawa, Ontario, Canada, and Secure Systems & Technologies Ltd (SST) of Gloucester, United Kingdom. In that same year, Cryptek also acquired the assets of ION Networks of South Plainfield, New Jersey, United States.

Bankruptcy 

In November 2008, the company filed for Chapter 11 bankruptcy protection. In March 2009, Cryptek petitioned to move to Chapter 7 bankruptcy.

Through a senior management purchase of assets, a new company Cryptek Technologies, Inc. began operation on March 11, 2009.

In July, 2009, Cryptek was acquired by defense and aerospace company, API Technologies Corp.

Products 

 ION Secure Remote Management Systems - a suite of products to control and manage vendor remote access on enterprise networks.
 Netgard Identity Card Access Systems - a suite of products that control and manage user access to walk-up devices, such as multi-function printers and scanners, by requiring users to have a valid Smartcard or Common Access Card (CAC).
 TEMPEST and Emanation Security Products - a suite of computing and communications products that conform to various government standards for electronic emanation control known as TEMPEST. These products are provided under the Cryptek, Emcon and SST brand names.

See also 
 Encryption
 Information Security
 TEMPEST

References

External links 
 http://www.cryptek.com
 http://www.sst.ws
 http://www.emcon.com
 https://web.archive.org/web/20081224072647/http://www.nsa.gov/ia/industry/tempest.cfm
 http://www.techord.com/electronics/gadgets/crypteks-new-physically-lockable-usb-flash-drive/

Information technology companies of the United States
Networking companies of the United States
Software companies established in 1986
Computer security companies
Private equity portfolio companies
Companies based in Dulles, Virginia
Companies that filed for Chapter 11 bankruptcy in 2008
1986 establishments in the United States